Van Laar is a Dutch surname. Notable people with the surname include:

 Johannes van Laar (1860–1938), Dutch chemist
 Roelof van Laar (born 1981), Dutch politician
 Timothy Van Laar (born 1951), American artist

See also
 Laar (surname)
 the Van Laar equation

Surnames of Dutch origin